Walace de Sousa Novais (born 25 May 1993), simply known as Walace, is a Brazilian footballer who plays as a defender for Juventude Samas.

Club career
Born in São Paulo, Walace joined Santos youth setup in 2008, aged 15. He made his first team debut on 11 June 2011, in a 1–1 away draw against Cruzeiro EC.

On 3 June 2013, he was promoted to Santos' first team alongside Léo Cittadini. On 4 February 2014 he was loaned to Guarani, but appeared rarely.

On 19 December 2014 Walace signed for Luverdense, after his link with Peixe expired.

Career statistics

References

External links

Walace at ZeroZero

1993 births
Living people
Footballers from São Paulo
Brazilian footballers
Association football defenders
Campeonato Brasileiro Série A players
Campeonato Brasileiro Série B players
Campeonato Brasileiro Série D players
Santos FC players
Guarani FC players
Luverdense Esporte Clube players
União Recreativa dos Trabalhadores players
Esporte Clube Pelotas players
Clube Atlético Penapolense players
Mixto Esporte Clube players
Associação Atlética Internacional (Limeira) players
Moto Club de São Luís players